Shahrak-e Taleqani (also Romanized as Shahrak-e Ţāleqānī) is a village in Holayjan Rural District, in the Central District of Izeh County, Khuzestan Province, Iran. At the 2006 census, its population was 207, in 38 families.

References 

Populated places in Izeh County